This is a list of schools in Thurrock in the English county of Essex.

State-funded schools

Primary schools

Abbots Hall Primary School, Stanford-le-Hope
Arthur Bugler Primary School, Stanford-le-Hope
Aveley Primary School, Aveley
Belmont Castle Academy, Grays
Benyon Primary School, South Ockendon
Bonnygate Primary School, South Ockendon
Bulphan CE Academy, Bulphan
Chadwell St Mary Primary School, Chadwell St Mary
Deneholm Primary School, Little Thurrock
Dilkes Academy, South Ockendon
East Tilbury Primary School, East Tilbury
The Gateway Primary Free School, Grays
Giffards Primary School, Corringham
Graham James Primary Academy, Corringham
Harris Primary Academy Chafford Hundred, Chafford Hundred 
Harris Primary Academy Mayflower, Chafford Hundred
Herringham Primary Academy, Chadwell St Mary
Holy Cross RC Primary School, South Ockendon
Horndon-on-the-Hill CE Primary School, Horndon-on-the-Hill
Kenningtons Primary Academy, Aveley
Lansdowne Primary Academy, Tilbury
Little Thurrock Primary School, Little Thurrock
Orsett CE Primary School, Orsett
Ortu Corringham Primary School, Corringham
Purfleet Primary Academy, Purfleet
Quarry Hill Academy, Grays
St Joseph's RC Primary School, Stanford-le-Hope
St Mary's RC Primary School, Tilbury
St Thomas of Canterbury RC Primary School, Grays
Shaw Primary Academy, South Ockendon
Somers Heath Primary School, South Ockendon
Stanford-le-Hope Primary School, Stanford-le-Hope
Stifford Clays Primary School, Stifford
Thameside Primary School, Grays
Tilbury Pioneer Academy, Tilbury
Tudor Court Primary School, Chafford Hundred
Warren Primary School, Chafford Hundred
West Thurrock Academy, Grays
Woodside Academy, Little Thurrock

Secondary schools

The Gateway Academy, Grays	
Grays Convent High School, Grays	
Harris Academy Chafford Hundred, Chafford Hundred
Harris Academy Ockendon, South Ockendon
Harris Academy Riverside, Purfleet
Hathaway Academy, Grays
Ormiston Park Academy, Aveley
Orsett Heath Academy, Grays
Ortu Gable Hall School, Corringham
Ortu Hassenbrook Academy, Stanford-le-Hope
St Clere's School, Stanford-le-Hope
Thames Park Secondary School, Grays
William Edwards School, Stifford

Special and alternative schools
Beacon Hill Academy, South Ockendon
Olive AP Academy, Tilbury
Treetops Free School, Grays
Treetops School, Grays

Further education
South Essex College
USP College

References

Schools in Thurrock
Thurrock